The 1906–07 IAAUS men's basketball season began in December 1906, progressed through the regular season, and concluded in March 1907.

Season headlines 

 The 1906–07 season was the first to be played after the founding of the Intercollegiate Athletic Association of the United States (IAAUS), which renamed itself the National Collegiate Athletic Association (NCAA) in 1910.The 1906–07 Auburn Tigers men's basketball team represented Auburn University during the 1906–07 Intercollegiate Athletic Association of the United States college basketball season. The team captain was C.W. Woodruff.
 In February 1943, the Helms Athletic Foundation retroactively selected Chicago as its national champion for the 1906–07 season.
 In 1995, the Premo-Porretta Power Poll retroactively selected Williams as its national champion for the 1906–07 season.
The 1906–07 Army Cadets men's basketball team represented United States Military Academy during the 1906–07 college men's basketball season. The head coach was Harry Fisher, coaching his first season with the cadets. The team captain was Lewis Rockwell.

Conference membership changes

Regular season

Conference winners

Statistical leaders

Awards

Helms College Basketball All-Americans 

The practice of selecting a Consensus All-American Team did not begin until the 1928–29 season. The Helms Athletic Foundation later retroactively selected a list of All-Americans for the 1906–07 season.

Major player of the year awards 

 Helms Player of the Year: Gilmore Kinney, Yale (retroactive selection in 1944)

Coaching changes 

A number of teams changed coaches during the season and after it ended.

References